Larisa Savchenko and Meredith McGrath were the defending champions but only Savchenko competed that year with Helena Suková.

Savchenko and Suková lost in the semifinals to Sabine Appelmans and Miriam Oremans.

Kristie Boogert and Nathalie Tauziat won in the final 6–4, 6–4 against Appelmans and Oremans.

Seeds
Champion seeds are indicated in bold text while text in italics indicates the round in which those seeds were eliminated. All four seeded teams received byes into the quarterfinals.

 Larisa Savchenko /  Helena Suková (semifinals)
 Kristie Boogert /  Nathalie Tauziat (champions)
 Els Callens /  Elena Likhovtseva (quarterfinals)
 Sabine Appelmans /  Miriam Oremans (quarterfinals)

Draw

External links
 1996 Sparkassen Cup Doubles Draw

Sparkassen Cup (tennis)
1996 WTA Tour